Seneca Hawk is a Los Angeles-based rock and roll trio consisting of Jonah Rivera, Kyle Beswick, and Ankur Bulsara.

History
Jonah, Kyle and Ankur all met as students at Cornell University in Ithaca, New York. Upon Kyle and Ankur's graduation (and Jonah's early departure), the band moved out to begin their careers in Los Angeles. After playing their first national tour in 2007 and frequently playing Los Angeles venues, including Spaceland, The Troubadour, and the Hotel Café, Seneca Hawk began working on Sun Year Long.

Sun Year Long
Sun Year Long is the debut LP from Seneca Hawk recorded in Studio City, California, with producer Adam Lasus (Clap Your Hands Say Yeah, Yo La Tengo, Army Navy, and Oliver Future).  The album was recorded analog on an Otari MX-80 24-Track 2-Inch tape machine and was mastered in Brooklyn, New York, by Joe Lambert. The album was scheduled to be released in early 2010. The first single from Sun Year Long, "Steal Your Heart Away," was released digitally on November 3, 2009.  The song has been downloaded more than 500,000 times in the third installment of the iPhone game Tap Tap Revenge.

Members
 Jonah Rivera – guitar, vocals
 Kyle Beswick – bass, backing vocals
 Ankur Bulsara – drums

Discography

Albums
 2010: Sun Year Long

Singles
 2009: Steal Your Heart Away

References

External links
 Official sites
Seneca Hawk official website

Indie rock musical groups from New York (state)